Western New England University School of Law is a private, ABA-accredited law school in Western Massachusetts. Established in 1919, the law school has approximately 8,000 alumni who live and work across the United States and internationally. Western New England Law offers both full-time and part-time programs. It is a college within Western New England University.

History

Western New England College was established in 1919 as a branch of Northeastern University (then Northeastern College) and began offering evening law classes. In 1923, the first seven law graduates were recognized. In 1951, Western New England College received an independent charter and ended its affiliation with Northeastern. The full-time law program began in 1973. The S. Prestley Blake Law Center was first opened in 1978 at a cost of $3.4 million. The building is named after S. Prestley Blake, who made a substantial gift of $250,000 to the project. The law school underwent major renovations in 2007, including a new wing, lobby, and entrance. The project also saw the reconfiguration of several classrooms, creating smaller and more intimate learning environments.

On July 1, 2011, Western New England College School of Law officially became Western New England University School of Law. The Massachusetts Board of Higher Education approved the change in March 2011.

Programs

The primary aim of the law school is its J.D. program, where first year students are divided into small sections of less than 60 people, providing approximately an 11:1 student-faculty ratio. The school also offers a part-time day or evening program. In addition, the law school has the following six joint-degree programs: J.D./M.B.A., J.D./M.S.A., and J.D./M.S.O.L. with the Western New England University College of Business; J.D./M.S.E.M. with the Western New England University College of Engineering; J.D./M.S.W. with Springfield College; and a J.D./M.R.P. with the University of Massachusetts Amherst. Undergraduates of certain undergraduate institutions can take advantage of the "3+3 program," which allows certain students to complete a B.A. and a J.D. in six years.

Concentrations

J.D. students have the option to concentrate in the following fields: Business Law, Criminal Law, Estate Planning, Gender and Sexuality Studies, International and Comparative Law, Public Interest Law, or Real Estate.

Clinics and externships
The law school offers numerous clinical opportunities, where students can gain practical knowledge and develop professional skills under the supervision of experienced practitioners. The following clinics are currently offered: Criminal Law Defense Practicum, Criminal Law Prosecution Practicum, Discrimination Clinic, Elder Law Clinic, Family Law Mediation Clinic, International Human Rights Clinic, Legal Services Clinic (includes Immigration, Family, and Housing Law), Real Estate Practicum, and the Small Business Clinic. Students also have the opportunity to gain practical legal experience for academic credit through offered or student-secured externships.

The university's Center for Innovation & Entrepreneurship also offers a resource for small business development in the greater Pioneer Valley region. The Small Business Clinic is the cornerstone program of the Center. The Clinic pairs students from the School of Law and College of Business to offer personal, professional legal assistance to entrepreneurs in the business start-up stage.

LL.M. programs

The law school offers a live, interactive online program in Elder Law and Estate Planning.

The Center for Gender and Sexuality Studies
Established in 2012, the Center for Gender & Sexuality Studies is a resource for the School of Law community, the greater legal community, and the general public. Its work focuses on issues relating to gender and sexuality, including civil rights issues affecting women and sexual minorities.

Western New England Law Review

The Western New England Law Review publishes three issues per year. The editorial board consists of members of the School of Law who rank at or near the top 10 percent of their first-year class. The Law Review also permits a certain number of candidates based on the recommendation of their Legal Research and Writing professor at the end of their first year.

Employment

According to Western New England Law's official 2016 ABA-required disclosures, 42.7% of the Class of 2016 obtained full-time, long-term, bar passage-required employment nine months after graduation, excluding solo-practitioners. Western New England Law's Law School Transparency under-employment score is 30.1%, indicating the percentage of the Class of 2015 unemployed, pursuing an additional degree, or working in a non-professional, short-term, or part-time job nine months after graduation. The main employment destinations for 2013 Western New England Law graduates were Connecticut, Massachusetts, and New York.

Costs
For the 2017-2018 academic year, tuition is $40,954 for the full-time program and $30,298 for the part-time program.  The total cost of attendance (indicating the cost of tuition, fees, and living expenses) for the 2014-2015 academic year is $62,802 for the full-time program and $51,955 for the part-time program. The Law School Transparency estimated debt-financed cost of attendance for three years is $230,544. The average indebtedness of the 97% of 2013 Western New England Law graduates who took out loans was $120,677.

Notable people

Notable alumni
 Stephen Buoniconti '95 - Former member of the Massachusetts Senate (served 2005–2011) and former member of the Massachusetts House of Representatives (served 2001 - 2004).
 Lawrence F. Cafero '81 - Member of Connecticut House of Representatives and Republican House Leader.
 Gale D. Candaras '82 - Member of the Massachusetts Senate (served 2007–present) and former member of the Massachusetts House of Representatives (served 1996 - 2006).
 Michael A. Christ '02 - Former Deputy Majority Leader of Connecticut House of Representatives.
 Cheryl A. Coakley-Rivera '95, Member of the Massachusetts House of Representatives (served 1999–present).
 Michael Charles Green  '86 - District Attorney for Monroe County, New York.
 Daniel F. Keenan - Former member of the Massachusetts House of Representatives (served 1995–2007).
 John Kissel '84 - Member of the Connecticut State Senate.
Maura L. Melley '78 - Former Secretary of the State of Connecticut (served 1982–1983).
 Tim Murray '94 - Former Lieutenant Governor of Massachusetts and former Mayor of Worcester, Massachusetts.
 Larry O'Brien '42 - Former National Basketball Association Commissioner and former U.S. Postmaster General.
 Angelo Puppolo '01 - Member of the Massachusetts House of Representatives (served 2007–present) and former City Councilor in the city of Springfield, Massachusetts
 Joseph Rallo '76 - State of Louisiana's Commissioner of Higher Education.
 Thomas L. Stevenson '77 - Former member of the Pennsylvania House of Representatives (served 1997–2006).
 John E. Sweeney '91 - Former Republican member of the U.S. House of Representatives from upstate New York and noted conservative legislator.
 Mark G. Mastroianni '89 - U.S. District Court Judge for the District of Massachusetts (confirmed 2014), Former Hampden County District Attorney
 Lois Lerner - Former director of the Internal Revenue Service Exempt Organizations Unit and central figure of the IRS targeting controversy

See also 
Western New England University

References

External links
Western New England College School of Law 

Law schools in Massachusetts
Western New England University
Education in Springfield, Massachusetts
Universities and colleges in Hampden County, Massachusetts
Universities and colleges founded by the YMCA